Diomedes, el cacique de la junta is a 2015 Colombian telenovela produced and broadcast by RCN Televisión. It is based on the life of Diomedes Díaz Maestre, its highest rating was 16.5 rating people and so far averaging 13.5 rating people in the 9:00PM schedule. Since its release, it becomes the country's most-watched telenovela this year.

Cast 
 Orlando Liñan as Diomedes Díaz Maestre (adult)
 Juan Bautista Escalona as Diomedes Díaz (child)
 Kimberly Reyes as Lucia Arjona (adult)
 Laura Rodríguez as Lucia Arjona (young)
 Adriana Ricardo as Elvira Maestre "Mama Vila"
 Carlos Vergara Montiel as Rafael María Díaz
 Emilia Ceballos as Rosa Elvira Diaz "Ocha"
 Salomé Camargo Fadul as Rosa Díaz Maestre "Ocha" (child)
 Yorneis Garcia as Rafita Diaz Maestre
 Carolina Duarte as Bertha Mejía
 Álvaro Araújo as Marcos
 Alejandra Azcárate as Yurleidiz (villain)
 Luis Carlos Fuquen as Chencho
 Victor Hugo Trespalacios as Mono Arjona (villain) 
 Pillao Rodriguez as Jose Olarte
 Carmenza Gómez as Beatriz
 Emerson Rodríguez as Hernan Arjona
 Marciano Martínez as Papá Goyo Maestre 
 Cristián Better as Martín Maestre
 Paula Castaño as Betsy Liliana
 Eileen Moreno as Consuelo Martínez
 Angélica Blandón as Claudia Viviana
 Priscila Mendoza as Vilma
 Enilda Rosa Vega Borja -Tita
 Margarita Reyes as Barbara (villain)
 Julio Pachón as Comandante Pinzón (villain) 
 Éibar Gutiérrez as Juancho Rois
 Rafael Acosta as Joaco Guillén
 Alejandro Palacio as Don Alejo
 Mauricio Figueroa as Gabriel Muñoz
 Ramses Ramos as Mariano Saucedo
 Coco Zuleta as Emiliano Zuleta Díaz
 Juan José Granados as Nafer Durán
 Wilber Mendoza as Colacho Mendoza
 Rosendo Romero as Leandrito Sierra
 Orlando Acosta as Rafael Orozco Maestre
 Mabel Moreno as Lolo
 Aco Pérez as the white feather "el pluma blanca"
 Iroky Peréz as Jaime Peréz Porody
 Bibiana Corrales as Mariana Juliana
 Wilfrido Vargas as himself
 Jorge Barón as himself
 Juan Sebastián Calero as Gonzalo Rodríguez Gacha
 Shirley Gómez as María Paula
 Herbert King as Padre de María Paula
 Carlos Hurtado as Carlos Perdomo
 José Narváez as Sergio Molina
 Graciela Torres as "La negra candela"
 Jota Mario as himself
 Alejandra Miranda as Tía de Yurleidis
 Poncho Zuleta as himself
 Laura Osma as Mirna puente

References

External links 
  
 

2015 telenovelas
Colombian telenovelas
RCN Televisión telenovelas
2015 Colombian television series debuts
2015 Colombian television series endings
Spanish-language telenovelas
Television shows set in Bogotá
Television shows set in Barranquilla
Television shows set in Medellín